In topology, a branch of mathematics, Quillen's Theorem A gives a sufficient condition for the classifying spaces of two categories to be homotopy equivalent. Quillen's Theorem B gives a sufficient condition for a square consisting of classifying spaces of categories to be homotopy Cartesian. The two theorems play central roles in Quillen's Q-construction in algebraic K-theory and are named after Daniel Quillen.

The precise statements of the theorems are as follows.

Theorem B constructs  in a case when  is especially nice.

References 

Theorems in topology